Hellas ter Riet (born 21 June 1968) is a former professional tennis player from the Netherlands.

Biography

Tennis career
In 1986, ter Riet made her Federation Cup debut, appearing in four ties for the Netherlands. In her first match, against Canada, she won her singles rubber over Helen Kelesi, but lost the deciding doubles rubber to surrender the tie. She won all her singles matches in the consolation rounds, including over the USSR's Natalia Zvereva.

She made the second round of both the Australian Open and French Open in 1988. At the Australian Open she lost to fifth seed Hana Mandlíková, then at the French Open had to retire hurt with illness in the second set against Martina Navratilova.

Her best performance on the WTA Tour was a quarter-final appearance at Guarujá in 1989.

Personal life
She married former world number one doubles player Jacco Eltingh in 1997 and the following year gave birth to her first child.

ITF Circuit finals

Singles: 4 (2–2)

Doubles: 6 (2-4)

References

External links
 
 
 

1968 births
Living people
Dutch female tennis players
Sportspeople from Apeldoorn
20th-century Dutch women
20th-century Dutch people
21st-century Dutch women